The Djibouti Division 2 is the second tier of association football in Djibouti, after the Premier League. The league is contested by 10 clubs. The 20,000-capacity El Hadj Hassan Gouled Aptidon Stadium and 3,000-capacity Centre Technique National are the main venues of the league.

Champions

Wins by year

 2000–01: FC Barwaqo
 2001–02: FC Dikhil
 2002–03: Office National de Tourisme [Balbala]
 2003–04: AS Tadjourah
 2004–05: Sheraton Hôtel
 2005–06: FC Tour Eiffel
 2006–07: Guelleh Batal 
 2007–08: 
 2008–09: AS Tadjourah
 2009–10: 
 2010–11: APEJAS
 2011–12: Arhiba
 2012–13: Bahache/Université de Djibouti
 2013–14: Hôpital de Balbala
 2014–15: Bahache/Université de Djibouti
 2015–16: Cité Stade
 2016–17: AS Tadjourah
 2017–18: AS Barwaqo
 2018–19: Institut Saoudien 
 2019–20: AS Barwaqo
 2020–21: Arhiba
 2021–22: Q5/Nourie Transit

References

Football leagues in Djibouti
Second level football leagues in Africa